The Philadelphia Phillies are a Major League Baseball franchise based in Philadelphia, Pennsylvania. They play in the National League East division. Since the institution of Major League Baseball's Rule 4 Draft, the Phillies have selected 51 players in its first round. Officially known as the "First-Year Player Draft", the Rule 4 Draft is Major League Baseball's primary mechanism for assigning amateur baseball players from high schools, colleges, and other amateur baseball clubs to its teams. The draft order is determined based on the previous season's standings, with the team possessing the worst record receiving the first pick. In addition, teams which lost free agents in the previous off-season may be awarded compensatory or supplementary picks.

Of the 51 players picked in the first round by the Phillies, 26 have been pitchers, the most of any position; 20 of these were right-handed, while 6 were left-handed. Nine players picked in the initial round were outfielders, while six catchers, four first basemen, and four shortstops were selected. The team also selected one player each at second base and third base. Thirteen of the 45 players came from high schools or universities in the state of California, while Texas and Florida follow, with six and five players, respectively.

Eight Phillies first-round picks have won a championship with the franchise. Greg Luzinski (1968), Larry Christenson (1972), and Lonnie Smith (1974) were on the roster when the team won the 1980 World Series. Third baseman (later left fielder) Pat Burrell (1998), pitchers Adam Eaton (1996), Brett Myers (1999) and Cole Hamels (2002), and second baseman Chase Utley (2000) were all members of the team during the Phillies' 2008 World Series championship.

The Phillies have had five compensatory and seven supplementary picks since the institution of the First-Year Player Draft in 1965. These additional picks are provided when a team loses a particularly valuable free agent in the prior off-season, or, more recently, if a team fails to sign a draft pick from the previous year. The Phillies have failed to sign their first-round pick twice. The first occurrence was in 1965 (Mike Adamson); however, compensatory picks were not awarded at that time. The second occurrence was in 1997, when outfielder J. D. Drew, at the advice of agent Scott Boras, refused to sign a contract worth less than $10 million. Drew sat out of affiliated baseball in 1997, playing instead for the independent St. Paul Saints of the Northern League, and re-entered the 1998 Draft the following year. The Phillies were awarded an additional pick in that draft, with which they selected outfielder Eric Valent.

Key

Picks

See also
Philadelphia Phillies minor league players

Footnotes
 The Phillies lost their first-round pick in 1979 to the Cincinnati Reds as compensation for signing free agent Pete Rose.
 The Phillies lost their first-round pick in 1987 to the Detroit Tigers as compensation for signing free agent Lance Parrish.
 The Phillies gained a supplemental first-round pick in 1995 as compensation for losing free agent Danny Jackson.
 The Phillies gained a supplemental first-round pick in 1998 as compensation for failing to sign 1997 first-round pick J. D. Drew.
 The Phillies lost their first-round pick in 2003 to the Cleveland Indians as compensation for signing free agent Jim Thome.
 The Phillies lost their first-round pick in 2005 to the New York Yankees as compensation for signing free agent Jon Lieber.
 The Phillies gained a supplemental first-round pick in 2006 as compensation for losing free agent Billy Wagner.
 The Phillies gained a supplemental first-round pick in 2007 as compensation for losing free agent David Dellucci.
 The Phillies gained a supplemental first-round pick in 2008 as compensation for losing free agent Aaron Rowand.
 The Phillies lost their first-round pick in 2009 to the Seattle Mariners as compensation for signing free agent Raúl Ibañez.
 The Phillies gained a supplemental first-round pick in 2011 as compensation for losing free agent Jayson Werth.
 The Phillies gained a supplemental first-round pick in 2012 as compensation for losing free agent Ryan Madson.
 The Phillies gained a supplemental first-round pick in 2012 as compensation for losing free agent Raul Ibanez.

References
General references

In-text citations

External links
Philadelphia Phillies official website

First-round
Philadelphia Phillies
First